The 1995 Sandown 500 was an endurance race for 5.0 Litre Touring Cars complying with CAMS Group 3A regulations. The event was staged at the Sandown circuit in Victoria, Australia on 3 September 1995. Race distance was 161 laps of the 3.10 km circuit, totalling 499 km. It was the 30th "Sandown 500".

The race was won by Dick Johnson and John Bowe driving a Ford EF Falcon.

Race results

Race statistics
 Pole position: Craig Lowndes & Greg Murphy, 1m 13.1494s
 Race time of winning car: 3h 30m 22.82s
 Fastest race lap: Craig Lowndes, 1m 13.7557s on lap 36

See also
1995 Australian Touring Car season

References

External links
 Aaron Noonan, On This Day: Johnson-Bowe go back-to-back, www.supercars.com
 1995 Sandown 500 - Full Race video, www.youtube.com

Motorsport at Sandown
Sandown 500
Pre-Bathurst 500